Jatiya Sangsad Bhaban or National Parliament House, ( Jatiyô Sôngsôd Bhôbôn) is the house of the Parliament of Bangladesh, located at Sher-e-Bangla Nagar in the Bangladeshi capital of Dhaka. Designed while the country was still part of Pakistan by architect Louis Kahn, the complex is one of the largest legislative complexes in the world, covering .

The building was featured prominently in the 2003 film My Architect, detailing the career and familial legacy of its architect, Louis Kahn. Robert McCarter, author of Louis I. Kahn, described the National Parliament of Bangladesh as one of the twentieth century's most significant buildings.

History

Establishment

Before its completion, the first and second Parliaments used the Old Sangsad Bhaban, which currently serves as the Prime Minister's Office.

Construction began in October 1964 when Bangladesh was East Pakistan, ordered by Ayub Khan from the West Pakistan capital of Islamabad. Ayub believed constructing a modern legislative complex would placate Bengalis.

Jatiya Sangsad was designed by Louis Kahn. The government sought assistance from South Asian activist and architect Muzharul Islam who recommended bringing in the world's top architects for the project. He initially attempted to bring Alvar Aalto and Le Corbusier, who were both were unavailable at the time. Islam then enlisted Kahn, his former teacher at Yale.

Construction was halted during the 1971 Bangladesh Liberation War and was completed on 28 January 1982. Louis Kahn died when the project was approximately three-quarters completed and it continued under David Wisdom, who worked for Louis Kahn.

Current developments

During the government term that took office on 28 October 2001, the Government communicated plans to "complete Louis Kahn's plans" by constructing residences for the Speaker and Deputy Speaker. According to some prominent architects, no such plan existed in the original design. Although the construction was started, it was halted and the issue is still unresolved.

History of use by Parliament
Ten Parliaments have used the Jatiya Sangsad Bhaban as the Parliament building:
Second Parliament : 2 years 11 months (2 April 1979 – 24 March 1982)
Third Parliament : 1 year 5 months (10 July 1986 – 6 December 1987)
Fourth Parliament : 2 years 7 months (15 April 1988 – 6 December 1990)
Fifth Parliament : 4 years 8 months (5 April 1991 – 24 November 1995)
Sixth Parliament : 12 days (19 March 1996 – 30 March 1996)
Seventh Parliament : 5 years (14 July 1996 – 13 July 2001)
Eighth Parliament : 5 years (28 October 2001 – 27 October 2006)
Ninth Parliament : 5 years (6 January 2009 – 24 January 2014)
Tenth Parliament : 5 years (14 January 2014 - 7 January 2019)
Eleventh Parliament : Running since 7 January 2019

Architecture and design

Louis Kahn designed the entire Jatiya Sangsad complex, which includes lawns, lake and residences for the Members of the Parliament (MPs). The architect's key design philosophy was to represent Bengali culture and heritage, while at the same time optimizing the use of space. The exterior of the building is striking in its simplicity, with huge walls deeply recessed by porticoes and large openings of regular geometric shapes. The main building, which is at the center of the complex, is divided into three parts – the Main Plaza, South Plaza and Presidential Plaza. An artificial lake surrounds three sides of the main building of Jatiya Sangsad Bhaban, extending to the Members of Parliament hostel complex. This skillful use of water to portray the riverine beauty of Bengal adds to the aesthetic value of the site.

Design philosophy

Kahn's key design philosophy optimizes the use of space while representing Bengali heritage and culture. External lines are deeply recessed by porticoes with huge openings of regular geometric shapes on their exterior, shaping the building's overall visual impact.

In the architect Louis Kahn's own words:

The lake on three sides of the Bhaban, extending up to the Members' hostel adds to site's aesthetics and also portrays the riverine beauty of Bangladesh.

The Parliament building received the Aga Khan Award for Architecture in 1989.

Bhaban (main building)
The Bhaban consists of nine individual blocks: the eight peripheral blocks rise to a height of 110' while the central octagonal block rises to a height of 155'. All nine blocks include different groups of functional spaces and have different levels, inter-linked horizontally and vertically by corridors, lifts, stairs, light courts, and circular areas. The entire structure is designed to blend into one single, non-differentiable unit, that appears from the exterior to be a single story.

The main committee rooms are located at level two in one of the peripheral blocks. All parliamentary functionaries, including Ministers and chairpersons of some Standing Committees, have offices in the Bhaban. The Parliament Secretariat also occupies offices in the same building.

Main Plaza

The most important part of the Main Plaza is the Parliament Chamber, which can house up to 354 members during sessions. There are also two podia and two galleries for VIP visitors. The roof was designed with a clearance of a single story to let in daylight. Daylight, reflecting from the surrounding walls and octagonal drum, filters into the Parliament Chamber. The efficient and aesthetic use of light was a strong architectural capability of Louis Kahn.

The artificial lighting system has been carefully devised to provide zero obstruction to the entry of daylight. A composite chandelier is suspended from parabolic shell roof. This chandelier in turn consists of a metallic web, spanning the entire chamber, that supports the individual light fixtures.

Upper levels of the block (that contains the Chamber) contain the visitor and press galleries, as well as communication booths, all of which overlook the Parliament Chamber. The block also contains:
at level one, a library;
at level three, MPs' lounges; and
at the upper level, party rooms.

South Plaza
The South Plaza faces the Manik Mia Avenue. It gradually rises to a 20' height and serves as a beautiful exterior as well as the main entrance (used by members during sessions) to the Parliament Building. It contains:
controlling gates;
a driveway;
a main mechanical plant room;
offices of maintenance engineers;
equipment stores; and
an open plaza with steps and ramps leading directly to the main building.

Presidential Plaza

The Presidential Plaza lies to the North and faces the Lake Road. It functions as an intimate plaza for the MPs and other dignitaries. It contains marble steps, a gallery and an open pavement.

Other information
Completion date: 1982
Function: civic
Construction cost: US$32 million

Tourism and accessibility

Although entrance to the Bhaban, the Main Building, is limited to authorized members of Parliament and staff, the Jatiyo Sangshad complex is always open to visitors. North of the complex, across the Lake Road, is Crescent Lake and Chandrima Uddan. The two complexes together form a major attraction for tourists in Dhaka, especially during national holidays. The complexes are popular among joggers and skaters of Dhaka as well, since the complex is a popular walking route - which can be seen every morning and evening. The official Prime Minister's Residence is on the North West corner of the Mirpur Road and Lake Road crossing and is a five-minute walk from the Jatiya Sangsad Bhaban. The area is one of the higher security zones of Dhaka.

The Complex can be accessed using any of the four roads surrounding it, however, the Manik Mia Avenue and Lake Road are the easiest approaches.

Notes

References
McCarter, Robert [2004]. Louis I. Kahn. Phaidon Press Ltd, p. 512. .
Wiseman, Carter [2007]. Louis I. Kahn: Beyond Time and Style: A Life in Architecture, New York: W.W. Norton. .

External links

Bangladesh Parliament Legislative Information Centre
ArchNet Entry Images, articles on the Jatiyo Sangshad Bhaban.
Infographic of Jatiyo Sangshad Bhaban.
Seven Wonders of the World, Architecture The Globe and Mail has named it as one of the seven architectural wonders of the world.

Government buildings completed in 1982
Government buildings in Bangladesh
Buildings and structures in Dhaka
Louis Kahn buildings
National symbols of Bangladesh
Parliament of Bangladesh
Modernist architecture
Tourist attractions in Dhaka
1982 establishments in Bangladesh
Seats of national legislatures